Cloud Nine is the eighth studio album by American hip hop group Kottonmouth Kings. It was released on August 28, 2007, under Suburban Noize Records. Band member Daddy X stated that Cloud Nine is the "most adventurous" Kottonmouth Kings album release to date. Cloud Nine features artists such as Tech N9ne, the Insane Clown Posse, and Cypress Hill. It includes a bonus DVD containing videos for the songs "City 2 City", "Livin' Proof", "Think 4 Yourself", and others that not only include the Kottonmouth Kings, but also that of their newly signed labelmates. The album title was thought up by band member Pakelika. It is meant to show that it is their ninth official album and also referred to the so-called "greatness of being high with the heavens". (From informal English: to be on cloud nine - to be extremely happy)

As of the week of September 15, 2007 the album debuted at number 44 on the U.S. Billboard 200 chart, selling about 14,000 copies in its first week, #10 on the Billboards Top Rap Albums, and #3 on the Top Independent Albums chart. The albums also made it to #45 on the  Billboard Comprehensive Albums, #44 on the Billboard's Top Internet Albums, #14 on the Top Modern Rock/Alternative Albums, #14 on the Top Rock Albums and #13 on the Tastemakers chart.

Track listing

Personnel
Brad "Daddy X" Xavier – vocals, producer, executive producer
Dustin "D-Loc" Miller – vocals
Timothy "Johnny Richter" McNutt – vocals
Luiz "Lou Dogg" Gaez – drums, percussion
Robert "DJ Bobby B" Adams – turntables, programming, engineering
Jaxson – guitar
Joseph "Violent J" Bruce – vocals
Joseph "Shaggy 2 Dope" Ultser – vocals
Lady Love – additional vocals
Eddie Tatar – guitar, bass
Joe Tatar – drums
Clinton Calton – guitar
Damon Cisneros – guitar
Sky Blue Xavier – additional vocals
Samuel "Krizz Kaliko" Watson – vocals
Aaron "Tech N9NE" Yates – vocals
P. Bass Jones – bass
Louis "B-Real" Freeze – vocals, producer
Stoney Waters – additional vocals
Senan "Sen Dog" Reyes – vocals
Mike Kumagai – producer, engineering, mixing
Patrick "P-Nice" Shevelin – producer, engineering, mixing
Robert Rebeck – producer
Jay Turner – producer
Josh "UnderRated" Liederman – producer
Tom Baker – mastering
Kevin Zinger – executive producer, management
Devin DeHaven – photography
Ivory Daniel – management
Ron Opaleski – booking

Charts

References

External links

2007 albums
Kottonmouth Kings albums
Suburban Noize Records albums